Stephen Carl Livingstone (born 8 September 1969) is an English former professional footballer who played as a forward and makeshift defender from 1986 to 2004.

He began his career at Coventry City in 1986, though had little impact at the club before he joined Blackburn Rovers for a £450,000 fee in January 1991. He helped Rovers to win promotion to the top-flight via the play-offs 1992. In March 1993 he was sold on to Chelsea for a £350,000 fee, but only played the one league game for the club. He was loaned out to Port Vale in September 1993, before being moved on to Grimsby Town for £140,000 the following month. He spent the next ten years at the club, helping the "Mariners" to win promotion out of the Second Division via the play-offs in 1998, as well as the Football League Trophy title, again in 1998. He joined Carlisle United in 2003, before retiring due to injury in January 2004.

Career

Early career
Livingstone was promoted to the first team squad at Coventry City in July 1986 following one year on a Youth Training Scheme. He went on to make just under 50 appearances for the "Sky Blues" in all competitions between 1986 and 1991, including 31 in the First Division. He proved an able stand in for Kevin Drinkell, but despite scoring in the League Cup semi-final defeat to Nottingham Forest, he failed to establish himself in the starting eleven. He played under George Curtis, John Sillett, and Terry Butcher. In January 1991, Livingstone was signed by Don Mackay of Second Division side Blackburn Rovers for a fee of £450,000. He scored seven goals in his first ten games for Blackburn during the second half of the 1990–91 season, though would later lose his spot due to questions over his fitness. Rovers occupied the final play-off spot at the end of the 1991–92 season under new manager Kenny Dalglish, and went on to beat Leicester City 1–0 in the Wembley final. However Livingstone featured just twice in the 1992–93 Premier League campaign, in a 2–1 defeat to Everton at Goodison Park and a 1–1 draw with Middlesbrough at Ewood Park. He moved to Stamford Bridge in March 1993 after Chelsea manager David Webb paid out a £350,000 fee. While with the "Blues", Livingstone went on to only make one substitute appearance, playing in a 3–0 defeat to Manchester United at Old Trafford on 17 April; he replaced Neil Shipperley in the 55th minute of the game. Chairman Ken Bates did not renew Webb's contract, and Livingstone did not feature in new boss Glenn Hoddle's first team plans. In September 1993, he was signed by Port Vale manager John Rudge on a one-month loan; he played five Second Division games before returning to London.

Grimsby Town
In October 1993, Livingstone was loaned out to Grimsby Town, with the deal being made permanent for a £140,000 fee two months later. Grimsby were a small club struggling to survive in the First Division under Alan Buckley. He was an instant hit at Blundell Park and his performances earned him respect amongst the "Mariners" fans, he formed notable impressive strike partnerships with Clive Mendonca, Jack Lester and Lee Nogan. "Livvo" as he was known to Grimsby supporters, was able to use his frame and weight to make himself a handy target man, and was a frequent goalscorer in his ten years with the club. Despite recording just seven home wins in 1993–94, Town remained safely in mid-table. They then finished tenth in 1994–95 under new manager Brian Laws. Livingstone was the club's joint-top scorer in 1995–96 with ten goals, along with Paul Groves. Grimsby were relegated at the end of the 1996–97 campaign, despite Livingstone scoring six goals in 34 appearances, including a brace against Sheffield United.

With Alan Buckley returning as manager, the "Mariners" won immediate promotion in 1997–98 after beating Northampton Town 1–0 in the Second Division play-off final at Wembley. Grimsby also found success at Wembley in the Football League Trophy final after beating AFC Bournemouth 2–1 after extra time; Livingstone was a 55th-minute substitute for Daryl Clare. Throughout the campaign Livingstone hit nine goals in 59 games, scoring twice in clashes with Fulham, Leicester City, and Bristol Rovers. He played 30 games without scoring in 1998–99, as Town recorded an eleventh-place finish in the second tier.

Livingstone played 34 games in the 1999–2000 campaign, as Grimsby finished two places above the relegation zone; he scored just two goals, both coming against Stockport County in the FA Cup. New manager Lennie Lawrence was appointed for the 2000–01 campaign, and Livingstone continued to be a key player, finishing as the club's top-scorer with seven goals in 36 games. His last four years with Grimsby were hampered with injury, and he only made a cameo role in each season. He appeared in just three games in April in the 2001–02 season. On 17 August 2002, he collided badly with Derby County defender Danny Higginbotham and was knocked unconscious; this left Livingstone with a head injury that would see him out of action for a couple of months. His old target man status returned briefly, as he helped Grimsby edge a thrilling 6–5 win over Burnley in an impressive performance alongside fellow striker Steve Kabba. He posted 31 appearances in 2002–03, scoring three goals; however Grimsby were relegated in last place.

Carlisle United
Carlisle United manager Roddy Collins came in for the veteran forward and initially signed him on a free transfer in July 2003. However, Livingstone struggled with his fitness, and made a total of nine appearances for the club, with two red cards, one of them on his debut against York City, the other against Lincoln City. He also collected three yellow cards in this time, and all this without scoring a goal. He was placed on the transfer list four months after signing with the club, but due to a persistent back problem, he retired in January 2004. The "Cumbrians" went on to suffer relegation out of the Third Division, thereby losing their Football League status.

Personal life
Livingstone's father, Joe Livingstone, also played professional football. His son, Jed, had a trial with Grimsby Town in 2009. He now lives in his native Middlesbrough and buys and sells properties.

Career statistics
Source:

Honours
Blackburn Rovers
Football League Second Division play-offs: 1992

Grimsby Town
Football League Second Division play-offs: 1998
Football League Trophy: 1998

References

1969 births
Living people
Footballers from Middlesbrough
English footballers
Association football forwards
Coventry City F.C. players
Blackburn Rovers F.C. players
Chelsea F.C. players
Port Vale F.C. players
Grimsby Town F.C. players
Carlisle United F.C. players
Premier League players
English Football League players